Pantea Bahram (born 4 March 1970) is an Iranian actress. She has received various accolades, including a Crystal Simorgh and an Iran Cinema Celebration Award, in addition to nominations for five Hafez Awards and four Iran's Film Critics and Writers Association Awards.

Biography
Pantea Bahram was born in 1970 in Tehran, Iran. She attended the school of Arts and Literature at the Islamic Republic of Iran Broadcasting College and began her acting career in theater in 1988. She first became well known as an actor for her role in Mosafer (The Passenger).

Bahram directed the play "Made in Iran" ("Avazhick") in 2005, which was also staged in Finland in 2007.

Filmography

Cinema

 1999 : Zesht o ziba
 2000 : Through Sunglasses
 2003 : Banoo-ye man
 2003 : Tokyo bedoone tavaghof
 2005 : Eternal Children
 2006 : Fireworks Wednesday
 2008 : Sandali khali
 2008 : Shirin
 2009 : Endless Dreams
 2009 : Khabhaye Donbaledar
 2009 : Postchi se bar dar nemizanad
 2010 : Farewell Baghdad
 2010 : Hich
 2010 : Tehran, Tehran
 2011 : Asb heyvan-e najibi ast
 2012 : Needlessly and Causelessly
 2012 : Man Madar Hastam 
 2012 : Migren
 2013 : Tabaghe ye Hasas
 2013 : The Bright Day
 2014 : Biganeh
 2014 : Tabagheye hasas 
 2014 : Tragedy
 2015 : Marge Mahi
 2015 : The Nameless Alley
 2016 : Gozar movaghat
 2021: Butterfly Stroke
 2022: Killing a Traitor
 2022' Drown

Television

Awards and nominations

References

External links
 
 

1970 births
Living people
People from Tehran
Actresses from Tehran
Iranian film actresses
Iranian stage actresses
University of Tehran alumni
Iranian television actresses
21st-century Iranian actresses
Crystal Simorgh for Best Supporting Actress winners